James G. Marshall House is a historic home located at Niagara Falls in Niagara County, New York.  It is a three-story Arts and Crafts style dwelling built in 1913 by the industrialist and inventor James G. Marshall (1869–1960). It was designed by prominent local architect Simon Larke, who also designed the Former Niagara Falls High School. In April 1994, it opened as a bed and breakfast.

It was listed on the National Register of Historic Places in 2004.   It is located within the Park Place Historic District, listed on the National Register of Historic Places in 2010.

Larke was also the architect for Temple Beth El, 720 Ashland Avenue.

References

External links
Marshall, James G., House - Niagara Falls, NY - U.S. National Register of Historic Places on Waymarking.com
A Bed and Breakfast in Niagara Falls USA b&b

Houses on the National Register of Historic Places in New York (state)
Houses completed in 1913
American Craftsman architecture in New York (state)
Houses in Niagara County, New York
1913 establishments in New York (state)
National Register of Historic Places in Niagara County, New York